Judo at the 2014 Asian Para Games was held at the Incheon Asiad Main Stadium in Incheon, South Korea from 20 to 23 October 2014.

Medal summary

Medal table
According to the official record,

References

External links
 
 Athletics result

2014 Asian Para Games events
2014
Asian Para Games
Asian Para Games, 2014